Jan Holický (born 15 January 1974) is a Czech alpine skier. He competed in three events at the 2002 Winter Olympics in Salt Lake City.

References

External links
 

1974 births
Living people
Czech male alpine skiers
Olympic alpine skiers of the Czech Republic
Alpine skiers at the 2002 Winter Olympics
People from Teplice
Sportspeople from the Ústí nad Labem Region